Matt Black may refer to:

 Matt Black (DJ) (born 1961), British DJ and one half of music duo Coldcut
 Matt Black (Canadian football) (born 1985), Canadian football defensive back
 Matt Black (photographer) (born 1970), American documentary photographer

See also
 Matthew Black (1908–1994), Scottish minister and biblical scholar